For the alpine skier named Franz Fuchsbeger, please visit Fuxi Fuchsberger

Franz Fuchsberger (28 September 1910 – 1992) was an Austrian footballer who competed in the 1936 Summer Olympics.

International career
He was part of the Austria team, which won the silver medal in the football tournament. He played all four matches as forward, even after breaking both of his legs in the second quarter of the third game.

He played one match for the Austria national football team, in September 1936 against Hungary.

References

External links
profile

1910 births
1992 deaths
Austrian footballers
Austria international footballers
Footballers at the 1936 Summer Olympics
Olympic footballers of Austria
Olympic silver medalists for Austria
Olympic medalists in football
Medalists at the 1936 Summer Olympics
Association football forwards